This is a list of transfers in Bosnian football for the 2013 summer transfer window.
Only moves featuring a Premier League of Bosnia and Herzegovina, First League of the Republika Srpska and First League of the Federation of Bosnia and Herzegovina side are listed.

Premier League of Bosnia and Herzegovina

Borac Banja Luka

In:

Out:

Čelik

In:

Out:

Leotar

In:

Out:

Mladost Velika Obarska

In:

Out:

Olympic

In:

Out:

Radnik

In:

Out:

Rudar Prijedor

In:

Out:

Sarajevo

In:

	

Out:

Široki Brijeg

In:

Out:

Slavija

In:

Out:

Travnik

In:

Out:

Velež

In:
 

Out:

Vitez

In:

Out:

Željezničar

In:

Out:

Zrinjski

In:

Out:

Zvijezda Gradačac

In:

Out:

First League of the Republika Srpska

Borac Šamac

In:

Out:

Drina HE

In:

Out:

Drina Zvornik

In:

Out:

Kozara

In:

 

Out:

Mladost Gacko

In:

Out:

Modriča

In:

Out:

Napredak Donji Šepak

In:

Out:

Podrinje

In:

Out:

Rudar Ugljevik

In:

Out:

Sloboda Mrkonjić Grad

In:

Out:

Sloboda Novi Grad

In:

Out:

Sloga Doboj

In:

Out:

Sutjeska Foča

In:

Out:

First League of the Federation of Bosnia and Herzegovina

Branitelj

In:

Out:

Bratstvo

In:

Out:

Budućnost

In:

Out:

Čapljina

In:

Out:

GOŠK

In:

Out:

Gradina

In:

Out:

Igman

In:

Out:

Iskra

In:

Out:

Jedinstvo

In:

Out:

Mladost

In:

Out:

Orašje

In:

Out:

Podgrmeč

In:

Out:

Radnički

In:

Out:

Rudar

In:

Out:

Sloboda

In:

Out:

See also
Premier League of Bosnia and Herzegovina
First League of the Republika Srpska
First League of the Federation of Bosnia and Herzegovina
2013–14 Premier League of Bosnia and Herzegovina
2013–14 First League of the Republika Srpska
2013–14 First League of the Federation of Bosnia and Herzegovina

References

Transfers
Bosnia
2013